Dostan (also Romanized as Dostan) is a village in Shepiran Rural District, Kuhsar District, Salmas County, West Azerbaijan Province, Iran. At the 2006 census, its population was 609, in 109 families.

References 

Populated places in Salmas County